Arizona's 6th congressional district is a congressional district located in the U.S. state of Arizona and encompasses parts of Pima County, Pinal County, Graham  County, Greenlee County, Cochise County. It consists mostly of the suburbs of Tucson, including Oro Valley, Marana, Green Valley, and Vail. The district is currently represented by Republican Juan Ciscomani. It was one of 18 districts that voted for Joe Biden in the 2020 presidential election while being won or held by a Republican in 2022.

The new 6th district includes a notable military presence.

History
Arizona picked up a sixth district after the 1990 census. It covered the northeast quadrant of the state, from Flagstaff to the New Mexico border. Most of its population, however, was located in the northeastern portion of the Valley of the Sun, including Tempe and Scottsdale.

After the 2000 census, most of the Maricopa County portion of the old 6th became the 5th district, while the 6th was reconfigured to take in most of the former 1st district. It included parts of Mesa, Chandler and all of Gilbert as well as the fast-growing town of Queen Creek. It also contained the city of Apache Junction in Pinal County. For the first time since its creation in 1951, it didn't include any of Phoenix itself. The district and its predecessors had seen its share of Phoenix gradually reduced amid the Valley's explosive growth in the second half of the 20th century.

George W. Bush received 64% of the vote in this district in 2004. John McCain—who represented this district (then numbered as the 1st) from 1983 to 1987—received 61.32% of the vote in the district in 2008, making it his best showing in his home state.

After the 2010 census, the old 6th district essentially became the 5th district, while the 6th was redrawn to take in most of the old 3rd district.

Demographics
According to the APM Research Lab's Voter Profile Tools (featuring the U.S. Census Bureau's 2019 American Community Survey), the district contained about 604,000 potential voters (citizens, age 18+). Of these, 77% are White and 13% are Latino. Immigrants make up 9% of the district's potential voters. Median income among households (with one or more potential voter) in the district is about $77,000, while 8% of households live below the poverty line. As for the educational attainment of potential voters in the district, 42% hold a bachelor's or higher degree.

Recent election results in statewide elections

List of members representing the district
Arizona began sending a sixth member to the House after the 1990 Census.

Recent election results

2002

2004

2006

2008

2010

2012

2014

2016

2018

2020

2022

See also

 Arizona's congressional districts
 List of United States congressional districts

References
Specific

General
 Demographic information at census.gov
 2004 Election data at CNN.com
 2002 Election data from CBSNews.com
 2000 Election data from CNN.com
 1998 Election data from CNN.com

External links
 Maps of Congressional Districts first in effect for the 2002 election
 Tentative Final Congressional Maps for the 2012 election
 

06
Government of Maricopa County, Arizona
Government of Pinal County, Arizona
Constituencies established in 1993
1993 establishments in Arizona